Daniel Labrie is a Canadian former ice sledge hockey player. He won a silver medal with Team Canada at the 1998 Winter Paralympics.

References

Living people
Paralympic sledge hockey players of Canada
Canadian sledge hockey players
Paralympic silver medalists for Canada
Year of birth missing (living people)
Place of birth missing (living people)
Medalists at the 1998 Winter Paralympics
Paralympic medalists in sledge hockey
Ice sledge hockey players at the 1998 Winter Paralympics